The Rat River is a tributary of the Saint-François River. The "Rat River" flows in the municipality of Weedon, in the Le Haut-Saint-François Regional County Municipality, in the region administrative Estrie, Quebec, Canada.

Geography 

The hydrographic slopes adjacent to the "Rat River" are:
 north side: Saint-François River, Lake Louise;
 east side: Elgin Lake;
 south side: rivière au Saumon (Le Haut-Saint-François);
 west side: Saint-François River, rivière au Saumon (Le Haut-Saint-François).

The "Rat River" has its source in a forest environment on the boundary of the former municipalities of Weedon and Fontainebleau, on the west side of the mine road, west of Lake Elgin and east of Lake Louise.

Its course of  first heads south-west in parallel (south-east side) to Saint-François River, then turns north-west along the path of Fontainebleau, to its mouth.

Toponymy 

The toponym "Rivière au Rat" was formalized on December 5, 1968, at the Commission de toponymie du Québec.

See also 

 List of rivers of Quebec

Notes and references 

Rivers of Estrie
Le Haut-Saint-François Regional County Municipality